The seventh edition of the Johan Cruyff Shield was held on 11 August 2002 between 2001–02 Eredivisie and 2001–02 KNVB Cup winners Ajax, and Eredivisie runners-up PSV Eindhoven. Ajax won the match 3–1.

Match

Details

2002
Johan Cruijff-schaal
j
j
Johan Cruyff Shield